Pandurang Dattaram Raut (13 July 1946 – 3 October 2022) was an Indian politician, co-founder and president of the Goa Praja Party. Raut was a member of the Goa Legislative Assembly representing the Bicholim constituency. He also served as a cabinet minister from February 1991 to April 1994.

Personal life and death
Raut was born in Goa. He was married to Vilasini. On 3 October 2022, Raut died from a brief illness, at the age of 76. He was cremated at his native village, Sal in Bicholim.

References 

1946 births
2022 deaths
People from North Goa district
20th-century Indian politicians
21st-century Indian politicians
Maharashtrawadi Gomantak Party politicians
Trinamool Congress politicians from Goa
Nationalist Congress Party politicians from Goa
Goa MLAs 1989–1994
Goa MLAs 1999–2002